John Bates (born November 6, 1997) is an American football tight end for the Washington Commanders of the National Football League (NFL). He played college football at Boise State and was drafted by Washington in the fourth round of the 2021 NFL Draft.

Career
Bates played college football at Boise State and was drafted by the Washington Football Team in the fourth round (124th overall) of the 2021 NFL Draft. He signed his four-year rookie contract on May 13, 2021. Due to injuries to Logan Thomas and Ricky Seals-Jones, Bates had his first career start in the Week 11 win over the Carolina Panthers. In a December 26 game against the Dallas Cowboys, Bates scored his first NFL touchdown on a pass from Kyle Allen, which he fumbled but later recovered in the endzone.

In Week 12 of the 2022 season, Bates scored his second career touchdown against the Atlanta Falcons on a 16-yard pass from Taylor Heinicke.

References

External links

Washington Commanders bio
Boise State Broncos bio

1997 births
Living people
American football tight ends
Boise State Broncos football players
People from Lebanon, Oregon
Players of American football from Oregon
Washington Commanders players
Washington Football Team players